Hawking may refer to:

People 
 Stephen Hawking (1942–2018), English theoretical physicist and cosmologist
Hawking (surname), a family name (including a list of other persons with the name)

Film 
Hawking (2004 film), about Stephen Hawking
Hawking (2013 film), about Stephen Hawking

Animals 
Hawking (birds), in birds, catching flying insects
Hawking (falconry), the sport of hunting with hawks

Outer space 
7672 Hawking, a minor planet
Hawking radiation, thermal radiation emitted outside a black hole

Music 
Hawking (band), a Canadian alternative rock band

Trade 

 Street hawking, vending merchandise on the street

See also 
 Hawker (disambiguation)
 Hawk (disambiguation)